The 1865 Massachusetts gubernatorial election was held on November 7.

Governor John Albion Andrew did not run for a sixth term in office. Republican Alexander Bullock was elected to succeed him, defeating Democrat Darius Couch.

Republican nomination
At the Worcester convention on September 14, Alexander Bullock was nominated unanimously.

General election

Candidates
Alexander Bullock, Speaker of the Massachusetts House of Representative and former Mayor of Worcester (Republican)
Darius Couch, Major General of the Union Army (Democratic)

Results

See also
 1865 Massachusetts legislature

References

Governor
1865
Massachusetts
November 1865 events